This is a list of wars involving the Republic of Guatemala.

List

References

 
Guatemala
Guatemala-related lists